PFC Dynamo Stavropol is an association football club from Stavropol, south Russia, best known for winning the 1949 RSFSR championship in one of the 9 zones. In recent years it played mostly in Russian Professional Football League, the third league in the national hierarchy. Due to severe financial difficulties, Dynamo missed the opportunity to be promoted to the First Division in 2005. After that, it was formally liquidated two times and resurrected again as an amateur team, eventually redeeming the professional status. As of the season 2013–14, the team played in the amateur championship of Stavropol krai under the name Dynamo UOR. A separate club was renamed FC Dynamo GTS Stavropol for the 2014–15 season in the Russian Professional Football League. Before the 2015–16 season, FC Dynamo GTS was renamed  FC Dynamo Stavropol.

History
The club's most significant victory was achieved in 1949, when it earned the title of Champion of Russia.

From 1957 to 2004, Dynamo played in various leagues of the Soviet Union and Russia.

In 1957, it was called FC Trudovye Rezervy Stavropol and from 1958 to 1961 it was called FC Spartak Stavropol.

In 1980–1981 and 1985–1991, Dynamo played in the USSR First League. The best result was a 4th position in 1989.

In 1992, Dynamo were entitled to play in the Russian Top League and finished 15th. Dynamo's 12th position in 1993 is their best ever result in professional football. In 1994, Dynamo finished 15th and were relegated from the Top Division.

From 1995 to 1999, Dynamo played in the Russian First Division. The best position achieved was 5th in 1996.

From 2000 to 2004, Dynamo played in the South Zone of Russian Second Division and won the tournament in 2004, thus earning promotion to the First Division. Dynamo also won the Professional Football League Cup, a competition between zonal tournament winners, and became the champions of the Second Division.

In January 2005, the club was denied professional license due to financial difficulties and relegated to the Amateur Football League.

Since 2006, club has been playing in Russian Second Division again. It finished 2nd in 2007 season. It experienced financial difficulties in 2009 and did not play in the Second Division. Dynamo's license was taken over by FC Stavropolye-2009. 6 players from the 2008 Dynamo roster transferred to FC Stavropol for the 2009 season and 5 transferred to FC Stavropolye-2009. The club was resurrected in 2010, taking over another Stavropol team, FC Stavropolye-2009, and existed as a professional team until 2012.

A separate club was renamed FC Dynamo GTS Stavropol for the 2014–15 season in the Russian Professional Football League. Before the 2015–16 season, FC Dynamo GTS was renamed FC Dynamo Stavropol.

Current squad
As of 22 February 2023, according to the Second League website.

Reserve squad
Dynamo's reserve squad played professionally as FC Dynamo-d Stavropol from 1994 to 1997 in the Russian Third League.

Notable players
Had international caps for their respective countries. Players whose name is listed in bold represented their countries while playing for Dynamo.

 Aleksandr Novikov
 Yuri Pudyshev
 Albert Borzenkov
 Viktor Bulatov
  Vladislav Lemish
 Nikolai Olenikov
 Kirill Panchenko
 Roman Pavlyuchenko
 Sergei Podpaly
 Vladislav Ternavski
 Karapet Mikaelyan
 Rasim Abuşev
 Igor Getman
 Gurban Gurbanov
 Vyaçeslav Lıçkin
 Vladimir Sheleg
 Alyaksandr Vyazhevich
 Aleksandr Bogatyryov
 Renat Dubinskiy
 Vitaliy Levchenko
 Aleksandr Ignatow
 Oleksiy Antyukhyn
 Yuriy Hrytsyna

See also
Dynamo FC

External links
 Official site
 Fan Club
News about Dynamo-Stavropol (in English)

References

Football clubs in Russia
Association football clubs established in 1933
Stavropol
1933 establishments in Russia
Sport in Stavropol